Vello Tafenau (born 1952) is an Estonian politician. He was a member of X Riigikogu.

He was a member of Eestimaa Rahvaliit.

References

Living people
1952 births
Members of the Riigikogu, 2003–2007
Place of birth missing (living people)
Date of birth missing (living people)